The All-Round Wife was a South Korean television series starring Han Da-gam, Han Sang-jin, Shin Seung-hwan, and Shim Ji-ho. The series directed by Choi Ji-young, revolves around Seo Cho-hee, who struggles to raise the standard of life through a house in Gangnam, but she realizes that happiness is not about the house, but the loving people living in the house who care for each other. The daily drama  premiered on KBS1 on October 4, 2021 and aired on every weekday at 20:30 (KST) for 122 episodes till April 8, 2022.

Synopsis
Story of the TV series revolves around Seo Cho-hee (Han Da-gam) and her husband Kang Nam-goo (Han Sang-jin), who endeavour to raise their standard of life through a house in Gangnam. In the end they get the realisation that it is the people who live in the house bring happiness and not the house they live in.

Cast

Main
 Han Eun-jung as Seo Cho-hee, 38 years old
12-year-old advertising company AE
 Han Sang-jin as Kang Nam-goo, 41 years old
Seo Cho-hee's husband, Han River University associate professor 
 Shim Ji-ho as Seo Kang-rim, 37 years old, a divorce lawyer 
 Shin Hyun-tak as Kang Seok-goo, 33 years old, Kang Nam-goo's younger brother

Supporting

People around Seo Cho-hee 
 Yoon Da-young as Seo Bo-ri, 32 years old
 The younger sister of Seo Cho-hee and Seo Kang-rim, she likes to get attention from a young age and liked idols and became a trainee singer.
 Yang Mi-kyung as Oh Jang-geum, 63 years old
Seo Cho-hee's mother, she raised three children by running a side dish shop alone without a husband for over 30 years.
 Geum Bo-ra as Dook Na-ra 65 years old
 Seo Cho Hee's mother-in-law, she was president's wife, but one morning she lost her husband
 Jo Eun-sook as Oh Poong-geum, 53 years old
Seo Cho Hee's aunt, and Jang Geum's side dish employee. Because she only learned about dating from books. She is often deceived by men and cries. But still dreaming of running away alone.
 Kim Taeyeon as Kang Ri-an, 10 years old, Cho-hee's daughter

Won-ju and people around her 
Jo Hyang-gi as Noh Won-ju, 38 years old, high school classmate of Cho-hee
Bang Hyeong-do's wife, she felt inferior to Cho-hee. But now, she is  daughter-in-law of a wealthy family and lives in a high-end apartment in Gangnam and is envious of her classmates
 Shin Seung-hwan as Bang Hyeong-do, 42 years old, Wonju's husband
The eldest son of a multi-billionaire semi-rich. He is a man who dreams of one day having a full life with the legacy left by his father.
 Lee Chae-bin as Bang Sa-rang, 10 years old, Wonju's daughter
 Ahn Suk-hwan as Bang Bae-su, Bang Hyeong-do‘s Father

People at Com2Me Company 
 Kim Deok-hyun as Go Seong-man, 47 years old, CEO of Com2Me
 Han Jeong-woo as Yang Jae-min, 35 years old, Head of Com2Me
Colleague of Seo Cho-hee and only son of the AJ Group president
 Kim Ga-ran as Yeo Eui-kyung, 33 years old, member of Com2Me Planning Team 1
An employee of advertising agency where Seo So-hee works
 Ahn Jung-ho as Ok Soo Hyun, 29 years old, member of Com2Me Planning Team 1
 A subordinate of Seo Cho-hee's advertising agency
 Kim Jae-in as Ku Ro-mi, 28 years old, member of Com2Me Planning Team 1
 Han So-hyun as Mary Lee, 27 years old, member of Com2Me Planning Team 1
 Moon Il-taek as Moon Jung-gyu 
Head of the 2nd Planning Team of an Advertising Company. He's a colleague and rival to the 1st planning team leader Seo Cho-hee, and is jealous of her.

Han River University
 Jung Bo-min as Han Seul-ah, 24 years old, Han River University college student
She is the most positive and strong character in the world. She hates to  ask anyone for help, rather she will solve her problem on her own.
 Oh Yu-na as Choi Seon-hae, 38 years old, assistant professor at Han River University, high school classmate of Seo Cho-hee
 Kim Chae-yoon as Song Pa-ran, 24 years old, Han River University college student, daughter of Cho-hee's cousin sister-in-law
 Lee Myung-jun as Kim Dong-ha
 A fresh college student, Han Seul-ah's college classmate.
 Yuju as Gong Ju-ah, 24 years old, Han River University college student
Distinguished in education and beauty as the daughter of a wealthy family

Special appearance 
Lee Eun-yul as Seo-jin's mother (Ep.1)

Production

Shin Hyun-tak came back to TV series after a gap of 6 years. He last appeared in 2014 school drama
Hi! School: Love On.

On November 17, 2021, it was reported that actress Yoon Da-young was diagnosed with Corona 19 and the production team has suspended  filming following guidelines for prevention of further spread of the pandemic. On November 18, 2021 it was reported that one of the actor though positive, but was asymptomatic, so they plan to continue filming while monitoring the situation. On December 1, 2021 it was reported that actress Yoon Da-young has recovered from Covid 19 and returned to filming of the drama. Later, on December 2, 2021, the actress's agency Yoon Da Young has confirmed that she has recovered from the infection and is back to filming normally.

Release
The daily drama was premiered on KBS1 on October 4, 2021 and airs on every weekday at 20:30 (KST).

From November 29 to December 3, a special broadcast featuring the contents of Episodes 1 to 40 were aired.

The series ended on April 8, 2022 by airing 122nd episode, 2 more than initially planned 120 episodes.

Original soundtrack

Part 1

Part 2

Part 3

Part 4

Part 5

Part 6

Part 7

Part 8

Viewership 
 Audience response

Awards and nominations

Notes

References

External links
  
 The All-Round Wife at Daum 
 The All-Round Wife at Naver 
 
 

Korean Broadcasting System television dramas
2021 South Korean television series debuts
2022 South Korean television series endings
Korean-language television shows
South Korean romance television series
Television series by Mega Monster
South Korean melodrama television series
Television productions suspended due to the COVID-19 pandemic